The 15th Infantry Brigade was a formation of the Royal Hungarian Army that participated in the Axis invasion of Yugoslavia during World War II.

The 15th Infantry Brigade was redesignated 15th Light Division 17 February 1942.

Organization 
April 1941

15th Infantry Brigade (Kiskunhalas):
 20. Infantry Regiment (Kiskunhalas): Brigadier General Alajos Lemberkovits
I. Battalion (Kiskunhalas); II. Battalion (Kalocsa); III. Battalion (Baja)
 15. Field Artillery Division (Kiskunhalas): Lieutenant Colonel Tamas Szirmay

Commanders
15th Infantry Brigade
 Brigadier General Lajos Veress  (23 Jan 1939 - 1 Mar 1940)
 Brigadier General Alajos Lemberkovits  (1 Mar 1940 - 1 Aug 1941)
 Colonel József Grassy  (1 Aug 1941 - 17 Feb 1942)
15th Light Division
 Colonel József Grassy  (17 Feb 1942 - 1 Apr 1942)
 Major General Pál Platthy  (1 Apr 1942 - 1 Aug 1943)
 Brigadier General József Vasváry  (1 Aug 1943 - 10 Aug 1943)

Notes

References

 

Military units and formations of Hungary in World War II